Dyer Plateau is a broad ice-covered upland of north-central Palmer Land, bounded to the north by Fleming Glacier and Bingham Glacier, and to the south by the Gutenko Mountains.  It is buttressed by Goettel Escarpment.

The plateau was first explored on land and photographed from the air by the US Antarctic Service (USAS), 1939–41. It was named after J. Glenn Dyer, a surveyor with the then General Land Office, Department of the Interior. He was leader of the USAS surface party which sledged from Fleming Glacier southeast across the plateau to the Welch Mountains, and U.S. observer with the Australian National Antarctic Research Expeditions during the 1956–57 season.

See also 
Laine Hills, a cluster of snow-covered hills that rise above Dyer Plateau
Pinther Ridge

References

External links 

Plateaus of Antarctica
Landforms of Palmer Land